Dessau Süd station is a railway station in the southern part of Dessau, Saxony-Anhalt, Germany.

References

Süd
Buildings and structures in Dessau